Dexterity is the sixth studio album by Australian blues/rock band Jo Jo Zep & The Falcons. The album was released in July 1981 and peaked at number 92 on the Australian Kent Music Report.

Track listing

Charts

References 

1981 albums
Jo Jo Zep & The Falcons albums
Mushroom Records albums